The Czechoslovak Figure Skating Championships were a national championship held annually in Czechoslovakia until its dissolution in 1993 into the Czech Republic and the Slovak Republic. Medals were awarded in the disciplines of men's singles, ladies' singles, pair skating, and ice dancing.

Medalists

Men

Ladies

Pairs

Ice dancing

See also
 Czech Figure Skating Championships
 Slovak Figure Skating Championships

References

Sources
 skater articles

External links
 historic info